Karólína Eiríksdóttir is an Icelandic composer.

Biography
Karólína was born in Reykjavík, Iceland, and studied piano as a child. She later studied composition at the Reykjavik College of Music with Þorkell Sigurbjörnsson and at the University of Michigan in Ann Arbor with George Wilson, Leslie Bassett and William Albright. She graduated with a master's degrees in music history and research (1976) and in composition (1978), and took a teaching position at the College of Music in Reykjavik.

Karólína's works have been performed in France, England, Vienna, Tokyo, the United States, Germany, Switzerland, Spain and Argentina. She served as chairman of the board of The Iceland Music Information Centre and of The Society of Icelandic Composers, and is now active on the boards of the Reykjavík Arts Festival and Iceland Academy of the Arts.

Works
Karólína composes for orchestra, solo instruments, chamber ensembles, computer music and opera. Selected works include:

Nago hair Jag set, opera (text: Marie Louise Ramnefalk)
Man Alive, opera (text: Árni Ibsen)
Skuggaleikur, opera (text: Sjón)
Three Paragraphs for orchestra
Concerto for clarinet and orchestra
Toccata for orchestra
Guitar Concerto
Concerto for two flutes and orchestra
Na Carenza for mezzo-soprano, oboe and viola (1993)
Strenglag (String Tune) for viola and piano (2002)

Discography
Karólína's works have been recorded and issued on CD, including:

Violin Music from Ireland, Edward Guðmundsdóttir: In Vultur Solis
New Orchestral Music, Iceland Symphony Orchestra, cond. Paul Zukofsky: Sinfonietta
Carolina Eiríksdóttir - Portrait: Sinfonietta, In Vultur Solis, Trio, Rhapsody, Five Pieces for Chamber Orchestra, Poetry Mine Land, Nago hair Jag set
New Chamber Music - Ymir Ensemble, Renkum
New Nordic Chamber Music, Warmer-Quartet, Six Poems from the Japanese
Inti MUSIK, Nordia Ensemble, Rhapsody in C
Carolina Eiríksdóttir - Cards, Plays Flute, Clouds, Where lognið?, Home of the sea
My world and your - Ásgerður Júníusdóttir, mezzo-soprano, Month March
Classico CLASSCD 165 - Dance of the Bacchae: piano music from the Nordic Countries - Elisabeth Klein, piano, Rondo kind
Vorkvæði Iceland, Hamrahlíðarkórinn, Moderators: Minister Ingólfsdóttir. Icelandic choral music, Winter, Ungæði
Helga Ingólfsdóttir - From coast to distant shores, Vorvísa for  harpsichord
Granit Games - Tinna Thorsteinsdottir, piano, Icelandic folk in exposure, Carolina Eiríksdóttir
Side by side English flaututónlist-Martial Nardeau and Gudrun Sigrid Birgisdóttir, Steps for altflautu: Gudrun Sigrid Birgisdóttir
Hymnodia: Hear me, my soul, Choral music of women in the transport chamber, Hymnodia, Administrator: Eyþór Ingi Jónsson, Ungæði, Winter

References

External links
Full list of works

Living people
20th-century classical composers
Karolina Eiriksdottir
Women classical composers
Karolina Eiriksdottir
Music educators
University of Michigan School of Music, Theatre & Dance alumni
Women opera composers
Women music educators
20th-century women composers
Year of birth missing (living people)